"Oh My" is a song by American hip hop artist DJ Drama, released on May 13, 2011, as the lead single from his third studio album Third Power. The song was produced by frequent collaborator Drumma Boy and features American rappers Fabolous, Roscoe Dash and Wiz Khalifa. The song peaked at #18 on the Billboard and #12 on the Top R&B/Hip-Hop Songs, making it the most successful song for DJ Drama to date.

Music video 
The music video, directed by Derek Pike was released on July 6, 2011 and can be purchased on iTunes The video features cameo roles from actor and comedian Kevin Hart, DJ Clue?, Big Sean, New England Patriots Wide Receiver Chad Ochocinco and Pittsburgh Steelers Outside Linebacker LaMarr Woodley.

Charts

Weekly charts

Year-end charts

Release information

Remix

"Oh My (Remix)" is a song by American hip hop artist DJ Drama and the official remix to the lead single from his third studio album Third Power. The song, included as the twelfth track on the album, maintains the original production from Drumma Boy, however features new guest appearances from American singer Trey Songz, and American rappers 2 Chainz and Big Sean. The song was released to digital retailers on August 9, 2011. On September 8, the official music video for the remix was released. Cameos in the video for the remix were made by Drumma Boy and Curren$y.

Release Information

Purchaseable Release

References

2011 singles
Fabolous songs
Wiz Khalifa songs
Roscoe Dash songs
Song recordings produced by Drumma Boy
Songs written by Trey Songz
2011 songs
Songs written by 2 Chainz
Songs written by Drumma Boy
Songs written by Big Sean
MNRK Music Group singles
Songs written by Roscoe Dash